Lionel Larry (born September 14, 1986) is an American sprinter who specializes in the 400 meters. Collegiately, he ran for the University of Southern California.

Larry won a gold medal at the 2009 World Championships after running in the preliminary heat of the 4 x 400 meter relay.

External links
Lionel Larry's USC Track Bio
USA Track & Field Bio

1986 births
Living people
American male sprinters
Sportspeople from Compton, California
University of Southern California alumni
Track and field athletes from California
World Athletics Championships winners